This is a demography of the population of Kuwait.

Expatriates account for around 60% of Kuwait's total population, with Kuwaitis constituting 38%-42% of the total population. The government and some Kuwaiti citizens consider the proportion of expatriates (which has been relatively stable since the mid-1970s) to be a problem, and in 2016 the number of deportations increased.

Governorates

Kuwait consists of six governorates: Hawalli, Asimah, Farwaniyah, Jahra, Ahmadi and Mubarak Al-Kabeer. Most people in Kuwait live in the governorates of Hawalli, Asimah, and Farwaniyah.

Historical populations

The biggest population difficulty in Kuwait involves the Bedoon, stateless people. According to Human Rights Watch in 1995, Kuwait has produced 300,000 stateless Bedoon. Kuwait has the largest number of stateless people in the entire region. The Bedoon issue in Kuwait is largely sectarian.

Vital statistics
UN estimates

Registered births and deaths

Structure of the population 

Structure of the population (1.01.2020) (Census - provisional):

Life expectancy 

Source: UN World Population Prospects

Ethnic groups
 Kuwaiti 41.4%, other Arab 21.4%, Asian (mostly South Asian) 35.3%, African 1%, other 0.7% (includes European, North American, South American, and Australian) (2018 est.)

Languages
Arabic (official)
English spoken widely

Religion
Muslim (official) 74.6%
Christian 18.2% 
Other and Unspecified 7.2%

See also
 Religion in Kuwait
 Expatriates in Kuwait

References

 
Society of Kuwait